The Problem with Everything: My Journey Through the New Culture Wars is a 2019 book on culture wars by Meghan Daum in which the author criticizes fourth-wave feminism, political correctness, woke-ness, social justice warriors, and cancel culture.

References

2019 non-fiction books
Political books
Books critical of modern liberalism in the United States
Gallery Books books